Community Safety or Community Security (CS) is, according to the United Nations Development Program (UNDP), a concept that seeks to operationalize human security, human development and state-building paradigms at the local level. The contemporary concept of community security, narrowly defined, includes both group and personal security. The approach focuses on ensuring that communities and their members are "free from fear". Yet, a broader contemporary definition also includes action on a wider range of social issues to ensure "freedom from want". Like community safety and citizen security, it promotes a multi-stakeholder approach that is driven by an analysis of local needs. By emphasizing the "community" aspect the concept seeks to embrace both cultures and contexts that are "individual-oriented", including many in Latin America, and cultures and contexts that are "group oriented", as are many in Africa and South Asia.

The customization of CS programs depends on the specific context, but a core characteristic of the approach is a bottom-up focus on security creation and stabilization. As an approach, CS is not dealing with security creation on a national level, for instance through top-down legislation or peace agreements on a government level. Instead it focuses on short- and long term solutions to security problems in specific communities. 

"Community" does not just refer to individual community members, but refers to all actors, groups and institutions within the specific geographic space. It therefore also includes civil society organizations, the police and the local authorities that are responsible for delivering security and other services in that area.

Examples of agencies working with a Community Safety approach are Saferworld, Danish Demining Group and the Geneva Centre for the Democratic Control of Armed Forces (DCAF).

References

External links 
 United Nations Development Program
 Danish Demining Group
 Saferworld
 DCAF

Community
Safety
Security